Omo Charlie Champagne, Vol. 1 is the third studio album by Nigerian singer Simi. It was released to coincide with her thirty-first birthday on April 19, 2019. The 13-track album features guest artists such as Patoranking, Maleek Berry, Falz and Adekunle Gold. Its production was primarily handled by Oscar, with additional production from Vtek, Legendury Beatz and Sess. Simi dedicated the album to her father Charles Oladele Ogunleye, who died in 2014. Omo Charlie Champagne, Vol. 1 was preceded by three singles: "I Dun Care", "Lovin" and "Ayo".

Background
In March 2019, Simi disclosed she would be releasing her third studio album Omo Charlie Champagne, Vol. 1 to coincide with her birthday on April 19, 2019. She disclosed this information in a series of social media messages. The album is a slight departure from the relatively afro-centric feel of Simisola, and is a mixture of sentimental ballad, Afropop, Afro-soul, R&B, EDM and moombahton. Its title is a direct reference to her late father Charles Oladele Ogunleye. Omo Charlie Champagne, Vol. 1 tackles themes of loss, happiness, loyalty, fears, break-up and sex.

Composition
The album opens with "Charlie", a soulful record that mourns Simi's father and pays tribute to him. The Vtek-produced track "Jericho" is a romantic reggaeton tune. In the emotive duet "By You", Simi and Adekunle Gold exchange vows and commit to their love. The Maleek Berry-assisted track "Immortal" has been described as an "expression of sensual sentiments" exemplified by lyrics like "Hold on tight for the ride of your life/don’t let go now/We can go all night". The catchy track "Love on Me" features a call and response chorus. "Move On" is an ode to heartbreak. "The Artist", a skit, highlights the struggles that artists endure in the industry. In "Mind Your Bizness", Falz and Simi cautioned listeners against gossiping. On the album's closing track "Hide and Seek", Simi wields her vulnerability with confidence and sex appeal.

Singles and other releases
"I Dun Care" was released as the album's lead single on August 10, 2018. It was produced by Oscar and recorded in Yoruba and English. The song focuses on themes of love and relationship. The accompanying music video for "I Dun Care" was shot and directed by Clarence Peters.

The album's second single "Lovin" was released on November 2, 2018. It was also produced by Oscar and contains a guitar riff by OC Omofuma. In "Lovin", Simi sings about the beauty of her love interest and her desire to see him and be intimate with him.<ref name="Konbini 11">{{cite web |author1=Adewojumi Aderemi |title=Simi Proudly Shows Off Her Man In The Music Video For 'Lovin |url=https://www.konbini.com/ng/entertainment/music/listen-simis-gleeful-affectionate-new-song-lovin/ |publisher=Konbini |access-date=2019-04-20 |archive-url=https://web.archive.org/web/20190420001408/https://www.konbini.com/ng/entertainment/music/listen-simis-gleeful-affectionate-new-song-lovin/ |archive-date=2019-04-20 |url-status=live }}</ref> Wale Owoade of Pan African Music praised the song's vibe and lyricism. The visuals for "Lovin" was directed by Aje Filmworks and is consistent with its lyrics.

The Jùjú-inspired track "" (Yoruba: Joy) was released on January 24, 2019, as the album's third single. Produced by the production duo Legendury Beatz, it is inspired by the music of Ebenezer Obey. TooXclusive's Tomiwa described the song as "a mid-tempo jam". The music video for "Ayo" was shot and directed by Director K and depicts the daily life of Lagosians in inhospitable environments.

On June 21, 2019, Simi released the music video for the Patoranking-assisted song "Jericho". The accompanying music video for "Jericho" was directed by Adasa Cookey and mirrors a 1990s party. On July 19, 2019, Simi released the music video for "By You". It was shot in Los Angeles and features footage from Simi and Adekunle Gold's adventure across the city. The bakery and landmark building Randy's Donuts is depicted in the video.

Critical receptionOmo Charlie Champagne, Vol. 1 received positive reviews from music critics. Pulse Nigeria's Motolani Alake awarded the album 9.1 stars out of 10, calling it "excellent" and saying songs such as "Jericho", "Immortal", "Move On" and "Hide and Seek" showcase Simi as an "evolving artist that understands the need to evolve without necessarily betraying her brand". A writer for NotJustOk gave the album 4.5 stars out of 5, acknowledging Simi for "experimenting with different sounds without changing the core element of her unique style".

Debola Abimbolu of Native magazine said Omo Charlie Champagne, Vol. 1 "listens even closer to the promised-land destination Simi has been inching toward since her music career kicked off with Ogaju in 2008. Her clever lines and captivating vocals have captured the zeitgeist". The Star''s Davies Ndolo granted the record a 3/5 rating, acknowledging Simi's voice and saying she "manages to give her audience an experience" despite the album's air of familiarity.

Track listing

Notes
 "—" denotes a skit

Personnel

Simisola Ogunleye – primary artist, writer
Patrick Okorie – featured artist, writer
Adekunle Kosoko – featured artist, writer
Maleek Shoyebi – featured artist, writer
Folarin Falana – featured artist, writer
Oscar – production 
Vtek – production 
Legendury Beatz – 
Sess – 
Fiokee – guitar 
OC Omofuma – guitar 
Okwi – trumpet 
Alaba – percussion

Release history

References

2019 albums
Simi (singer) albums
Albums produced by Legendury Beatz
Albums produced by Vtek
Albums produced by Sess
Albums produced by Oscar (record producer)
Yoruba-language albums